Robert Chisholm (born 1985) is a Welsh international lawn and indoor bowler and former England international bowler.

Career
He bowls for Swansea Indoor Bowling Club and the Blue Anchor BC. He reached a world ranking high of 19 in 2009, the same year in which he won the Welsh International Open.

Awards
He was awarded the 2010 Young Player of the Year by the World Bowls Tour.

References

Living people
Welsh male bowls players
1985 births